DYKR (96.7 FM), broadcasting as 96.7 XFM, is a radio station owned by DCG Radio-TV Network and operated by Y2H Broadcasting Network, Inc., serving as the Visayas flagship station of XFM Philippines. The station's studio and transmitter are located at the 4th floor, Monarch Finance Corporation (MFC) Bldg., Lacson St., Bacolod.

History
The station was established in 1993 by Exodus Broadcasting Company as one of the provincial WRock stations. After its Manila flagship station was acquired by Manila Broadcasting Company on October 6, 2008, the station was relaunched as a separate entity from WRocK Online. In May 2010, due to lack of resources and financial challenges, WRocK Online, along with the station, went off the air.

In 2020, DCG Radio-TV Network acquired the frequency from Exodus. In early 2022, Yes2Health Advertising took over the station's operations and began its test broadcast as XFM, carrying a news and music format. XFM Bacolod officially launched on April 4, 2022.

References

Radio stations in Bacolod
Radio stations established in 1993